Ali Mussa Daqduq is a senior Hezbollah leader and senior advisor to Asa'ib Ahl al-Haq leader Qais al-Khazali.
He was captured by US troops in Basra, Iraq on 20 March 2007 along with Qais al-Khazali and his brother Laith al-Khazali. He is alleged to have participated in a 20 January 2007 attack killing five US troops in Karbala, Iraq. Later, in 2012, two Iraqi courts found him not guilty of masterminding the 2007 raid on an American military base and released him from prison. US Intelligence has alleged that Daqduq's testimony during his internment is key evidence for collaboration between Iran and Hezbollah.

On 2 July 2007 US forces identified that they had captured Daqduq. 
They asserted he was a member of Hezbollah, and was operating with support from Iran.
The 2 July press briefing published images of Daqduq's forged identity documents.
Iranian officials denied that assertion on 4 July 2007. Daqduq pretended to be deaf and mute when he was captured, and refused to speak for weeks.

In November 2011 Reuters reported that the US was negotiating with the Iraqi government to hold Daqduq in US custody after the US pulls out of Iraq in December 2011. An agreement could not be reached, and Daqduq was transferred to Iraqi custody on 18 December 2011.

On 7 May 2012, Iraq dismissed terrorism and false documents charges against Daqduq. The case was automatically appealed, and he remained imprisoned until the case was heard in superior court. The United States believed that releasing him was a very bad idea, that the evidence is clear, and that he was likely to commit more acts of resistance against US occupation forces if released. Officials in the military commissions system in the United States began procedures to charge Daqduq with war crimes (specifically, that he killed or ordered killed four US soldiers captured during a raid); the future of this is unclear.

On 16 November 2012, Daqduq was released from Iraqi custody as the Iraqi government determined that it no longer had a legal basis to hold him.

On 13 March 2019, Israel Defense Forces spokesperson Lt. Col. Jonathan Conricus accused Daqduq of having come back to Lebanon and then Syria, and founding a Hezbollah-operated network of "a few" Syrian operatives manning outposts in the Golan Heights border village of Hader, Syria and collecting intelligence against Israeli targets. The accusation included video footage of men walking to and from the outposts.

References

Living people
Hezbollah members
1969 births